The Inca finches form the genus Incaspiza, of finch-like birds in the tanager family Thraupidae. They were traditionally placed in the family Emberizidae, but molecular phylogenetic studies have shown that they are closely related to the Thraupidae. Both their scientific and common name refer to the Incan civilization.

They are endemic to arid scrub in central and northern Peru. Buff-bridled, gray-winged and little Inca finches are restricted to the Marañón Valley. The rufous-backed Inca finch occurs either on the west slope of the Andes and both slopes of the Marañón Valley and is restricted to higher elevations, compared to great Inca finch which only occurs on the west slope of the Andes, but generally lower than the rufous-backed Inca finch. They are rather terrestrial, and typically forage within dense plant growth on the ground, but commonly perch higher, for example on the top of a tall cactus or in a small tree, when singing. They are typically seen singly or in pairs, but sometimes in small groups outside the breeding season. They normally do not take part in mixed-species flocks.

All have a pointed orange-yellow bill, a primarily gray head and chest, a paler buff or whitish belly, extensive white to the outer tail-feathers, and a small – but contrasting – black mask and chin. Except in the gray-winged Inca finch, all have a rufous back or wings.

Taxonomy and species list
The genus Incaspiza was introduced in 1898 by the American ornithologist Robert Ridgway with the great Inca finch as the type species. The name combines Incas with the Ancient Greek spiza meaning "finch". The genus was traditionally placed with the buntings and New World sparrows in the subfamily Emberizinae within an expanded family Emberizidae. A molecular phylogenetic study published in 2014 found that Incaspiza was embedded in the tanager family Thraupidae. Within this family, the genus is now placed with Rhopospina and Porphyrospiza in the subfamily Porphyrospizinae.

The genus contains five species.

References

 Schulenberg, T., D. Stotz, D. Lane, J. O'Neill, & T. Parker III. (2007). Birds of Peru. Christopher Helm Publishers. 

Taxa named by Robert Ridgway